Fotiou is a Greek surname. It is the surname of:
 Damien Fotiou, Australian actor.
 Elli Fotiou (born 1939), Greek actress.
 Panagiotis Fotiou (born 1964), Greek long-distance runner.
 Theano Fotiou (born 1946), Greek architect and government minister.
 Harikleia Fotiou (1918–1984), Greek painter and engraver.

Greek-language surnames
Surnames
Patronymic surnames